The International Health Exhibition was one of a series of international exhibitions held in South Kensington, London, in the 1880s under the patronage of Queen Victoria and the Prince of Wales. Four million people visited the 1884 exhibition. The exhibition's motto was "From labour health, from health contentment springs".

See also
 International Fisheries Exhibition 1883
 International Inventions Exhibition 1885

References

External links 
 
Official catalogue

1884 in London
Exhibitions in the United Kingdom
1880s in health
Health promotion
Health in the Royal Borough of Kensington and Chelsea
South Kensington
1884 festivals